Patrick Shea may refer to:

Patrick Shea (civil servant) (1908–1986), Northern Irish civil servant
Patrick Shea (Utah lawyer) (born 1948), American lawyer known for freedom of the press cases
Patrick Shea (California lawyer), American lawyer that represented Orange County, California in their financial restructuring
Paddy Shea (1886–1954), Australian rules footballer